Hankendi may refer to:

 Stepanakert, capital and the largest city of Nagorno-Karabakh Republic, also called Khankendi
 Hankendi, Elazığ, a town in the district of Elazığ, Elazığ Province, Turkey